Zolotukhino is the name of several inhabited localities in Russia.

Urban localities
Zolotukhino, Zolotukhinsky District, Kursk Oblast, a work settlement in Zolotukhinsky District of Kursk Oblast

Rural localities
Zolotukhino, Kirov Oblast, a village in Prosnitsky Rural Okrug of Kirovo-Chepetsky District of Kirov Oblast
Zolotukhino, Kurchatovsky District, Kursk Oblast, a khutor in Dronyayevsky Selsoviet of Kurchatovsky District of Kursk Oblast
Zolotukhino, Moscow Oblast, a village in Astapovskoye Rural Settlement of Lukhovitsky District of Moscow Oblast
Zolotukhino, Cherlaksky District, Omsk Oblast, a village in Yuzhno-Podolsky Rural Okrug of Cherlaksky District of Omsk Oblast
Zolotukhino, Pavlogradsky District, Omsk Oblast, a village in Novouralsky Rural Okrug of Pavlogradsky District of Omsk Oblast
Zolotukhino, Krasnozorensky District, Oryol Oblast, a village in Uspensky Selsoviet of Krasnozorensky District of Oryol Oblast
Zolotukhino, Mtsensky District, Oryol Oblast, a village in Cheremoshensky Selsoviet of Mtsensky District of Oryol Oblast
Zolotukhino, Kunyinsky District, Pskov Oblast, a village in Kunyinsky District, Pskov Oblast
Zolotukhino, Porkhovsky District, Pskov Oblast, a village in Porkhovsky District, Pskov Oblast
Zolotukhino, Zabaykalsky Krai, a selo in Shilkinsky District of Zabaykalsky Krai